Anthony Robin Ellis (born 8 January 1942) is a British actor and cookbook writer best known for his role as Captain Ross Poldark in the 29 episodes of the 1975 BBC classic series Poldark, adapted from a series of books by the British author Winston Graham. He also appeared in Fawlty Towers, Cluedo, The Good Soldier (an adaptation of the Ford Madox Ford novel), Elizabeth R (playing Essex), The Moonstone, Bel Ami, Sense and Sensibility (which also featured Clive Francis), The Casebook of Sherlock Holmes, She Loves Me (in which he sings) and Blue Remembered Hills (written by Dennis Potter). In 2015–17 and 2019 he appeared in the Poldark series remake as Reverend Halse.

Life and career
Ellis was born in Ipswich, Suffolk. He was educated at the independent Highgate School in Highgate in north London, and at Fitzwilliam College, Cambridge where he read history and appeared in over 20 plays. His first West End performance was in Sheridan's The Rivals at the Haymarket Theatre, as Captain Jack Absolute. He went on to play in The Real Inspector Hound at the Criterion Theatre and Widowers' Houses at the Royal Court. He was part of the innovative Actors' Company, founded in 1972 by Ian McKellen and Edward Petherbridge, organised and run democratically by the actors themselves. In that repertory company he appeared in 'Tis Pity She's a Whore, Ruling the Roost, The Way of the World, The Wood Demon, The Bacchae, Tartuffe, King Lear and Knots (based on the R. D. Laing book).

Ellis's big break came in 1975 with his first major role in a popular television series. He played the heart throb Ross Poldark in the BBC 1 series, Poldark.

In 1969, he played Ames in the film Arthur? Arthur!. Ellis co-starred with Lee Remick in the Merchant Ivory film The Europeans (1979), based on the novel by Henry James, playing the role of John Acton. Ellis appeared in the CBS mini-series The Curse of King Tut's Tomb (playing Howard Carter, the Englishman who discovered the tomb of King Tut), in the British TV drama Heartbeat and in a BBC adaptation of A Dark-Adapted Eye (1994) a psychological thriller written by Ruth Rendell.

Ellis also had a long career in the theatre, including a stint with the Royal Shakespeare Company. He appeared there in a musical version of The Comedy of Errors playing Pinch; in King Lear playing Edmund; Troilus and Cressida playing Achilles; and in Much Ado About Nothing playing Don Pedro. His last West End theatre performance was with Zoë Wanamaker in Sylvia by A.R. Gurney at the Apollo Theatre in 1996.

He is a well-known voiceover artist, and co-owned a voiceover agency called Voices in London for many years. He has narrated documentaries, including Fall of the Wall, The Second Russian Revolution, The Death of Yugoslavia and End of Empire.

He is the author of a memoir entitled Making Poldark about the series (originally published by Bossiney Books). Making Poldark was expanded and revised in 2012, and republished by Palo Alto Publishing. An audio version of his memoir was released on Audible in June 2015.

He had a recurring role in the BBC/Mammoth adaptation of Poldark as Reverend Halse.

In 2021, he played the Ghost in an online production of Hamlet, produced by the Gorilla Repertory Theater in New York, which was scheduled for completion in autumn 2021.

Cookbook writer

His first cookbook, Delicious Dishes for Diabetics: A Mediterranean Way of Eating, was published in 2011. The US edition was titled Delicious Dishes for Diabetics: Eating Well with Type 2 Diabetes.

His second cookbook, Healthy Eating for Life, came out in 2014. His third cookbook, Mediterranean Cooking for Diabetics: Delicious Dishes to Control or Avoid Diabetes was published in 2016 by Little, Brown UK. His fourth cookbook, Robin Ellis's Mediterranean Vegetarian Cooking was published in June 2020 by Little, Brown UK.

Personal life
Ellis lives with his wife Meredith in southwest France. His younger brothers are the actor Jack Ellis and the director Peter Ellis, who died in 2006.

References

External links 

Robin Ellis' Blog
Robin Ellis Interview at Best British TV
Robin Ellis interview at Classic Film & TV Cafe

1942 births
Alumni of Fitzwilliam College, Cambridge
British cookbook writers
Living people
English male stage actors
English male television actors
People educated at Highgate School
20th-century English male actors
21st-century English male actors
English expatriates in France
Vegetarian cookbook writers